Oligodon signatus, also known as the half-keeled kukri snake, the barred kukri snake, or the banded kukri snake, is a species of snake of the family Colubridae.

The snake is found in Singapore, on the island of Sumatra in Indonesia and Sarawak and Sabah in Peninsular Malaysia.

References 

signatus
Snakes of Southeast Asia
Reptiles of Malaysia
Reptiles of Singapore
Reptiles of Indonesia
Reptiles described in 1864
Taxa named by Albert Günther
Reptiles of Borneo